Karim Ullah High School is a secondary school at Daganbhuiyan Upazila in Feni District in Bangladesh. The school is situated in the Matubhuiyan Union of the upazila. The school operates with Class VI to Class X. The school is a MPO-Index based institution. There is a large pond along with a beautiful ancient mosque in front of the school. Unlike other educational institutions the school has its huge playground behind its academic building.

There is Feni Little River flowing just beside the school playground. There are various types of extra-curricular activities held in the school premises every year such as debate, annual sport, observing many national and international days, participating science fair and scouting, student scholarship programs.

Structure
The academic institutes are classified in two types, one is a two-storied building and the other is a tin shed building.

References

High schools in Bangladesh